Jeffrey J. Moe (born May 19, 1966) is an American former professional basketball player. He played in the Continental Basketball Association for the Cedar Rapids Silver Bullets during the first part of the 1988–89 season before being released in late December 1988. Moe played collegiately at the University of Iowa from 1984 to 1988 before being selected in the 1988 NBA draft.

Basketball career

After graduating from Brebeuf Jesuit in Indianapolis, Indiana, Moe attended the University of Iowa. At Iowa, Moe averaged 11.1 points as a junior (1986–1987) and 12.9 as a senior (1987–1988), as the Hawkeyes went 30–5 and 23–10 in those two seasons.

Moe was drafted in the second round (42nd overall) by the Utah Jazz, but never appeared in an NBA game. Playing in 14 games for the Silver Bullets, Moe scored 75 points, an average of 5.35 per game. After his brief professional basketball career, Moe became a real estate executive in Indiana.

References

1966 births
Living people
American men's basketball players
Basketball players from Indianapolis
Cedar Rapids Silver Bullets players
Iowa Hawkeyes men's basketball players
Shooting guards
Utah Jazz draft picks